Jackie Jackson is the self-titled debut album from Jackie Jackson, the eldest member of The Jackson 5,  released on Motown Records. It was arranged by Eddy Manson, Gene Page and The Corporation. It was released a month after G.I.T.: Get It Together.

Track listing
Side A
"Love Don't Want to Leave" (The Corporation, Christine Yarian) - 3:10
"It's So Easy" (The Corporation) - 2:57
"Thanks to You" (Beatrice Verdi, Christine Yarian) - 3:15
"You're The Only One" (The Corporation) - 3:03
"Didn't I (Blow Your Mind This Time)" (Thom Bell, William Hart) - 3:15

Side B
"Do I Owe" (The Corporation, Christine Yarian) - 3:25
"Is It Him or Me" (The Corporation, Christine Yarian) - 4:26
"In My Dreams" (The Corporation, Christine Yarian) - 3:05
"One and the Same" (The Corporation, Christine Yarian) - 2:55
"Bad Girl" (Berry Gordy, William Robinson) - 4:10

References

External links
Jackie Jackson-Jackie Jackson at Discogs

1973 debut albums
Jackie Jackson albums
Albums arranged by Gene Page
Albums produced by Berry Gordy
Albums produced by the Corporation (record production team)
Motown albums